Jim McMillan (born November 29, 1952) is a former American football quarterback who played one season with the Hamilton Tiger-Cats of the Canadian Football League. He was drafted by the Detroit Lions in the fourteenth round of the 1975 NFL Draft. He played college football at Boise State University and attended Vallivue High School in Caldwell, Idaho. McMillan was named to the Division II Associated Press All-American first team in 1974. He was inducted into the Boise State Hall of Fame in 1982 and is the only player in the school's history to have his number retired.

References

External links
Just Sports Stats

Living people
1952 births
Players of American football from Idaho
American football quarterbacks
Canadian football quarterbacks
American players of Canadian football
Boise State Broncos football players
Hamilton Tiger-Cats players
People from Caldwell, Idaho